Ian Wright Seddon (born 14 October 1950) is a footballer who played as a midfielder in the Football League for Bolton Wanderers, Chester, Stockport County, Chesterfield, Cambridge United, Rochdale and Wigan Athletic.

He wrote a biography of Bolton and England full-back Tommy Banks.

References

External links
Ian Seddon at Aussie Footballers

1950 births
Living people
People from Prestbury, Cheshire
Sportspeople from Cheshire
English footballers
Association football midfielders
Bolton Wanderers F.C. players
Chester City F.C. players
Stockport County F.C. players
Chesterfield F.C. players
Cambridge United F.C. players
Rochdale A.F.C. players
Macclesfield Town F.C. players
Wigan Athletic F.C. players
Runcorn F.C. Halton players
Newcastle KB United players
English Football League players
National Soccer League (Australia) players